Wauwatosa West High School is a comprehensive four-year public high school located in the city of Wauwatosa, Wisconsin, United States.  West opened in 1960/1961 as a sister-school to Wauwatosa East High School; together they are part of the Wauwatosa School District.

History 
Overcrowding of the city's only high school led the city to build a new high school on the west side of the newly enlarged city. Built in 1960 at 11100 West Center Street and opened in 1961, it was called Wauwatosa West High School. The original high school was renamed Wauwatosa East. Because the Longfellow and Hawthorne Junior High Schools were also overcrowded, another school was built in 1969 just west of this building at 11400 West Center Street. When the new building opened, it became Wauwatosa West High School, and the previous building became Whitman Junior High School.  Originally scheduled for completion in 1970, a fire damaged part of the building during construction, delaying its opening until 1971.

In 1993, an associate principal was shot and killed by a 21-year-old former student inside the school.

Enrollment 
As of the 2017-18 school year, the school had an enrollment of 1,152 students and 68.4 classroom teachers (on an FTE basis), for a student–teacher ratio of 16.9:1. There were 169 students (14.7% of enrollment) eligible for free lunch and 29 (2.5% of students) eligible for reduced-cost lunch.

Extracurricular activities

Athletics 
The school won the Wisconsin State Boys Volleyball Championship in 1964, defeating Antigo High School in a pool of 70 participating schools.

The boys' swimming team won the 1971 state championship, defeating runner-up Waukesha High School in a field of 77 participating schools.

The city on June 4, 2002, gave Wauwatosa West the go-ahead to begin construction on a $1.5 million upgrade of its athletic facilities.

The school dance team (division 2) known as "TDT" or Trojan Dance Team has won multiple state championships since they began the team.

Fine arts 
Student musicians and thespians participate in a variety of extracurricular activities, including band, orchestra, and theater.

The band department's performing groups include marching band, pep band, concert band, and jazz band.  The band traveled to Hawaii in April 2015, visiting and performing at the Pearl Harbor Memorial.

The symphony orchestra and concert orchestra perform throughout the year, including a holiday "Kinderkonzert" for children in the community.

The theater department, known as the Trojan Players, puts on two major productions each year.

Notable alumni
Scott Bergold (born 1961), offensive tackle who played one season in the NFL for the St. Louis Cardinals
Michael G. Kirby (born 1952), former member of the Wisconsin State Assembly
Dr. Kay Koelsch Nelson (born 1957), Professor, National Science Foundation Career Scholar 
John La Fave (born 1949), Wisconsin politician
Karen McQuestion, author
Steve Sisolak (born 1953), Governor of Nevada
Andrew Stadler (born 1988), professional soccer player in Sweden

References

External links 
 Official site

Public high schools in Wisconsin
Educational institutions established in 1960
Schools in Milwaukee County, Wisconsin
1960 establishments in Wisconsin
Wauwatosa, Wisconsin